Philip Nozuka (born 1987) is a Canadian-American actor.

Life and career
Nozuka was born in Queens, New York City, to a Japanese father, Hiromitsu Nozuka, and a Canadian mother, Holly Sedgwick. He is the brother of singers Justin Nozuka and George Nozuka, and the nephew of actress Kyra Sedgwick and actor Kevin Bacon. He is a graduate of the Etobicoke School of the Arts for Musical Theatre and the National Theatre School of Canada in Montreal where he studied acting.

For film and television Nozuka is best known for his appearances on Degrassi: The Next Generation where he played Chester, and Disney's Aaron Stone where he played Freddie.

Nozuka appeared in David Cronenberg's 2012 film Cosmopolis, and in 2013's Carrie.

References

External links
 

1987 births
21st-century American male actors
American male film actors
American male television actors
American male voice actors
American expatriate male actors in Canada
American male actors of Japanese descent
American film actors of Asian descent
American people of Canadian descent
Canadian male film actors
Canadian male television actors
Canadian male voice actors
Canadian male actors of Japanese descent
Living people
People from Queens, New York
Sedgwick family